, nicknamed , is a Japanese animator and director, formerly for Studio Ghibli. After his directorial debut with Studio Ghibli (The Secret World of Arrietty), he became the youngest director of a theatrical film produced by the studio. He was nominated for the Academy Award for Best Animated Feature in 2015 for his second film, When Marnie Was There.

Together with Ghibli producer Yoshiaki Nishimura, Yonebayashi left Studio Ghibli in December 2014 after 18 years, and established Studio Ponoc in June 2015. His first film as director at Studio Ponoc is Mary and the Witch's Flower.

He studied at the Kanazawa College of Art, where he majored in commercial design.

Works

Films 
 Princess Mononoke (1997), In between animation, clean-up animation
 Jin-Roh: The Wolf Brigade (1998), In between animation
 My Neighbors the Yamadas (1999), In between animation
 Spirited Away (2001), Key animation
 Mei and the Kittenbus (2003), Animation Director
 Howl's Moving Castle (2004), Key animation
 Tales from Earthsea (2006), Assistant Animation Director
 Mizugumo Monmon (2006), Key animation
 Ponyo (2008), Key animation
 The Secret World of Arrietty (2010), Director, Storyboards, Unit Director
 From Up on Poppy Hill (2011), Key animation
 The Wind Rises (2013), Key animation
 When Marnie Was There (2014), Director, Screenplay
 Mary and the Witch's Flower (2017), Director, Screenplay
 Modest Heroes (2018), Director, Screenplay

Television 
 Serial Experiments Lain (1998), Key animation
 Ghiblies (2000 special), Key animation
 Monster (2004), Key animation
 Welcome to the Ballroom (2017), Key animation

Original video animations 
 Nasu: A Migratory Bird with Suitcase (2007), Key animation

References

External links 
 
 
 Ulike
 Nipponcinema
 Slashfilm

1973 births
Japanese animators
Japanese film directors
Japanese animated film directors
Anime directors
Living people
Studio Ghibli people